Senator Erwin may refer to:

Austin W. Erwin (1887–1965), New York State Senate
Charles K. Erwin (1837–1907), Wisconsin State Senate
George Z. Erwin (1840–1894), New York State Senate
Hank Erwin (born 1949), Alabama State Senate
James Erwin (politician) (1920–2005), Maine State Senate
Richard Erwin (1923–2006), North Carolina State Senate

See also
Senator Irwin (disambiguation)